St George's Orthodox Church, located in Vakathanam Kottayam, Kerala, India was established in 1904. The church is part of the Kottayam Diocese of Malankara Orthodox Syrian Church.

Churches in Kottayam district
Malankara Orthodox Syrian church buildings